Paul Etia Ndoumbe (born 20 April 1984 in Douala, Cameroon) is a Cameroonian rower. He competed in the single sculls event at the 2008 Summer Olympics where he finished 28th and in the single sculls event at the 2012 Summer Olympics where he finished 32nd.

References 

Sportspeople from Douala
1984 births
Living people
Cameroonian male rowers
Olympic rowers of Cameroon
Rowers at the 2012 Summer Olympics
Rowers at the 2008 Summer Olympics